Post-punk revival is a type of indie rock that emulates the sound of post-punk bands of the late 1970s and new wave bands of the early 1980s and has been stylistically tied to 1990s music movements such as shoegaze, Britpop, garage revival and post-hardcore. They feature a more artsy, complex sound than other branches of indie rock, and often add synthesizer or other electronic sounds to the traditional guitar, bass and drums lineup. Post-punk revivalism started in England in the early 2000s and, while it is still strongest there, has grown in popularity in the US, Australia and Canada. Post-punk revivalism is prevalent in the London and New York City music scenes.



!/#

 !!!
 ¡Forward, Russia!
 1990s

Back to top

A

 Action Action
 The Airborne Toxic Event
 Algiers
 Ambulance LTD
 Apollo Heights
 L'arc~en~ciel
 Arctic Monkeys
 Art Brut
 Astral
 Audra
 Autoramas
 The Automatic

Back to top

B

 Babyshambles
 Band of Skulls
 Battle
 Baumer
 Be Your Own Pet
 Beach Fossils
 Beastmilk
 Bell Hollow
 Bellmer Dolls
 The Birthday Massacre
 Big John Bates
 The Black Angels
 Black Ice
 The Black Keys
 Black Kids
 Black Lips
 Black Marble
 Black Midi
 Black Rebel Motorcycle Club
 Black Tie Dynasty
 Black Wire
 Blacklist
 Bloc Party
 The Blood Arm
 Blood Red Shoes
 Bombay Bicycle Club
 Born Ruffians
 The Boxer Rebellion
 Boy Harsher
 Boy Kill Boy
 The Bravery
 British Sea Power
 Broken Social Scene
Buerak
 Bunny Lake
 Le Butcherettes

Back to top

C

 Cachorro Grande
 Cartolas
 Catfish and the Bottlemen
 Cazals
 Los Campesinos!
 Cansei de Ser Sexy  
 Ceremony
 Chai 
 The Chalets
 Chapel Club
 The Chavs
 The Chinese Stars
 Chromatics
 Chvrches
 The Cinematics
 Cities In Dust
 Clap Your Hands Say Yeah
 Clearlake
 Clinic
 Clor
 The Cloud Room
 Cold Cave
 Cold War Kids
 Colder
 Communique
 The Courteeners
 The Cribs
 Cut Copy
 Cut Off Your Hands

Back to top

D

 Dandy Warhols
 The Datsuns
 The Dead 60s
 Dead Disco
 Death Cab For Cutie
 Death From Above 1979
 Deerhunter
 The Departure
 Desperate Journalist
 Detachment Kit
 Dirty Projectors
 Dirty Pretty Things
 Dismemberment Plan
 Division of Laura Lee
 Does It Offend You, Yeah?
 Dogs
 Dogs Die in Hot Cars
 Doves
 Dragons
 The Dreaming
 Drowners
 The Drums
 Duchess Says
 Los Dynamite

Back to top

E

 Eagulls
 Editors
 The Eighties Matchbox B-Line Disaster
 Electric Six
 Eliot Sumner
 Elefant
 Empire of the Sun
 Enon
 Entertainment
 Erase Errata
 Every Move a Picture

Back to top

F

 The Faint
 The Fratellis 
 The Fashion
 Film School
 Fine China
 Fight Like Apes
 Float Like Candy
 Foals
 Fontaines D.C.
 Franz Ferdinand
 The Fratellis
 Frausdots
 French Films
 French Kicks
 Friendly Fires
 Frightened Rabbit
 Frog Eyes
 Future Islands
 The Futureheads

Back to top

G

 Les Georges Leningrad
 Get Shakes
 GHUM
 Girls Names
 Githead
 Glasvegas
 GoGoGo Airheart
 Good Shoes
 Goribor
 The Gossip
 The Grates
 Grizzly Bear

Back to top

H

 Handsome Furs
 Hard-Fi
 Hatcham Social
 Have a Nice Life
 Los Hermanos
 The Hives
 The Hold Steady
 The Horrors
 Hot Hot Heat
 Humanzi
 Hypernova

Back to top

I

 I Love You But I've Chosen Darkness
 Iceage
 Idles
 Ikara Colt
 Infadels
 The Intelligence 
 The (International) Noise Conspiracy
 Interpol

Back to top

J

 The Jane Bradfords
 Japanese Cartoon
 Japanther
 Jarboli
 Jemina Pearl
 Jihad Jerry & The Evildoers
 The Joy Formidable
 Joywave
 Jupiter One

Back to top

K

 Kaiser Chiefs
 Kasabian
 The Killers
 Kill Hannah
 The Kills
 Kings of Leon
 Kittens for Christian
 The Klaxons
The Kooks

Back to top

L

 Ladytron
 Lansing-Dreiden
 The Last Shadow Puppets
 Late of the Pier
 LCD Soundsystem
 Le Tigre
 Les Savy Fav
 Liars
 The Libertines
 Lifelover
 The Little Flames
 Little Man Tate
 Local Natives
 The Long Blondes
 The Longcut
 Longwave
 The Lost Patrol
 Los Hermanos
 Louis XIV
 Love Is All
 Love of Diagrams
 Low Art Thrill

Back to top

M

 The Maccabees
 Made in Japan
 Mahogany
 Mando Diao
 Manic Street Preachers
 Mallu Magalhães
 Mannequin Depressives
 The Mary Onettes
 Masquerade
 Maxïmo Park
 Melody Club
 Men, Women & Children
 Metric
 MGMT
 Milburn
 Minus the Bear
 Modest Mouse
 Molchat Doma
 Monsters Are Waiting
 Moptop
 Morningwood
 Moving Units
 Murder By Death
 The Music
 Mute Math
 Mystery Jets

Back to top

N

 The Naked and Famous
 The National
 Neils Children
 Neptune
 New Pornographers
 The Nervous Return
 Nežni Dalibor
 Nightmare of You
 Noisettes
 Numbers

Back to top

O

 Obojeni Program
 OK Go
 The Open
 The Organ
 The Oxfam Glamour Models

Back to top

P

 Parquet Courts
 Passion Pit
 The Parlotones
 Pete and the Pirates
 Phantom Planet 
 Phase
 Phoenix
 The Photo Atlas
 Pigeon Detectives
 Pilot to Gunner
 Pin Me Down
 Pink Grease
 The Pink Spiders
 P.K. 14
 A Place to Bury Strangers
 Placebo
Ploho
 Polysics
 The Postal Service
 Preoccupations
 Pretty Girls Make Graves
 The Prids
 Priests
 Protomartyr
 The Paddingtons
 The Pipettes

Back to top

Q

 Q and Not U

Back to top

R

 Ra Ra Riot
 Radio 4
 The Rakes
 The Rapture
 The Rascals
 The Raveonettes
 Repetitor
 Reverend and the Makers
 The Revolutionary Hydra
 The Rifles
 Rival Schools
 The Robocop Kraus
 Robots In Disguise
 Rock Kills Kid

Back to top

S

 Satisfact
 Savages
 Les Savy Fav
 Scanners 
 Scatter The Ashes
 Selfish Cunt
 Selvagens à Procura de Lei
 Serena Maneesh
 Shame
 She Past Away
 She Wants Revenge
 The Sheila Divine
 The Shins
 Shiny Toy Guns
 SHITDISCO
 Silversun Pickups
 Six Finger Satellite
 Sledgeback
 Sluts of Trust
 Snow Patrol
 Snowden
 Soledad Brothers
 Soulwax
 The Sounds
 A Spectre Is Haunting Europe
 Spoon
 Squid
 Starflyer 59
 The Static Jacks
 Stellastarr*
 Stereophonics
 The Stills
 The Strokes
 Stylex
 Surfer Blood
 Supernaut
 Switches

Back to top

T

 The Temper Trap
 Tereu Tereu
 Terry Poison
 Thee Oh Sees
 These New Puritans
 Those Manic Seas
 The Thermals
 The Thrills
 Thriving Ivory
 Thunderbirds are Now!
 Tigers Jaw
 Titus Andronicus
 Tokyo Police Club
 The Tossers
 Trembling Blue Stars
 TV on the Radio
 The Twilight Sad
 Twisted Wheel
 Two Door Cinema Club

Back to top

U

 Ugly Casanova
 Uh Huh Her
 The Unicorns

Back to top

V

 The Vaccines
 Vampire Weekend
 Van She
 Tom Vek
 The Veils
 The Velvet Teen
 Vernian Process
 VHS or Beta
 Viagra Boys
 The Vines
 The Violets
 The Virgins
 Vola and the Oriental Machine
 The Von Bondies
 Vue

Back to top

W

 The Walkmen
 Walter Meego
 The Warlocks
 Warmduscher
 Wavves
 We Are the Physics
 We Are Scientists
 We Have Band
 We Were Promised Jetpacks
 Weep
 The Whip
 White Lies
 White Rabbits
 White Rose Movement
 The White Stripes
 Wild Beasts
 Wilderness
 Witch Hats
 Wolf Parade
 The Wombats
 Women

Back to top

X

 Xiu Xiu
 The xx
 XX Teens

Back to top

Y

 Yard Act
 Yeah Yeah Yeahs
 Young Knives
 The Young Werewolves

Back to top

Z

 The Zutons

Back to top

References

 
Post-punk revival